Rockledge, is a historic home located at Occoquan, Prince William County, Virginia, United States, near Washington D.C.

It was built in 1758 from stone at the request of John Balladine, a wealthy local industrialist. Architect William Buckland worked on this house.

The historic marker on the site reads:
John Ballendine built this finely proportioned Georgian House, "Rockledge," in c.1760. William Buckland, a premier colonial Chesapeake architect, reportedly designed it. "Rockledge" is a rare example of a Tidewater Virginia stone dwelling. Several entrepreneurs who sought to maximize Occoquan's potential as a port and industrial town resided there.

It was added to the National Register of Historic Places in 1973.

References

External links 
Rockledge Official site
Rockledge, Mill Street, Occoquan, Prince William County, VA: 33 photos, 11 measured drawings, and 6 data pages at Historic American Buildings Survey

Houses on the National Register of Historic Places in Virginia
Houses completed in 1758
Houses in Prince William County, Virginia
National Register of Historic Places in Prince William County, Virginia
Stone houses in Virginia
1758 establishments in Virginia